James Cerretani and Neal Skupski were the defending champions but only Skupski chose to defend his title, partnering Luke Bambridge. Skupski successfully defended his title.

Bambridge and Skupski won the title after defeating Marc Polmans and Max Purcell 4–6, 6–3, [10–6] in the final.

Seeds

Draw

References
 Main Draw

Odlum Brown Vancouver Open - Men's Doubles
2018 Men's Doubles